Gamba Airport  is an airport serving Gamba, Gabon.

See also
List of airports in Gabon
Transport in Gabon

References

External links
OpenStreetMap - Gamba
OurAirports - Gamba
FallingRain - Gamba Airport

Airports in Gabon